Troublesome Night 14 is a 2002 Hong Kong horror comedy film produced by Nam Yin and directed by Yip Wai-ying. It is the 14th of the 20 films in the Troublesome Night film series.

Plot
Christin works in a hotel owned by Budcasso, the fiancé of her friend, Zidane. When she is caught embezzling company funds, she turns to Zidane for help but Zidane refuses. Christin then pretends to attempt suicide, hoping that Budcasso would take pity on her, but her stunt goes wrong and she really dies. As she was wearing a red dress when she died, she becomes a vengeful ghost after death and returns to take her revenge. Meanwhile, Budcasso invites his ex-wife, Mrs Bud Lung, to attend his upcoming wedding. A rivalry ensues between Mrs Bud Lung, a traditional Chinese ghostbuster, and Zidane, who is well-versed in Western occult arts. However, they eventually become friends after joining forces to destroy the malevolent ghost of Christin. As Budcasso fears the supernatural, he abandons Zidane in the same manner he did to his ex-wife after seeing that his new fiancée is another ghostbuster.

Cast
 Law Lan as Mrs Bud Lung
 Si Ming as Zidane
 Tong Ka-fai as Bud Gay
 Iris Chai as Fion
 Ronnie Cheung as Bud Yan
 Anita Chan as Hok
 Emily Kwan as Christin
 Joe Junior as Budcasso
 Mr Nine as Lai Chor-kau
 Onitsuka as Lai Chor-pat

External links
 
 

2002 comedy horror films
2002 films
Hong Kong comedy horror films
2000s Cantonese-language films
Troublesome Night (film series)
2000s Hong Kong films